Nilaanjana is an Indian Bollywood actress and classical dancer. She has performed the dance form Kathak in more than 200 shows worldwide.

Career 
Nilaanjana started her career with Bengali film Shonar Sansar opposite Superstar Prosenjit Chatterjee. She has also acted in Hindi films like Zilla Ghaziabad, Right Yaaa Wrong, Halla Bol and recent Judwaa 2 as Kashi.
 
Not only has Nilaanjana performed in films, she has also appeared in commercials and theatre.

Filmography

References 

21st-century Indian actresses
Living people
Year of birth missing (living people)